Siah Kesh may refer to:
 Siah Kesh, Fuman
 Siah Kesh, Sardar-e Jangal, Fuman County
 Siah Kesh, Siahkalrud, Rudsar County